Igor Vladimirovich Grabovsky (born September 2, 1941) is a Russian water polo player who competed for the Soviet Union in the 1964 Summer Olympics.

In 1964 he was a member of the Soviet team which won the bronze medal in the Olympic water polo tournament. He played all six matches as goalkeeper.

See also
 Soviet Union men's Olympic water polo team records and statistics
 List of Olympic medalists in water polo (men)
 List of men's Olympic water polo tournament goalkeepers

External links
 

1941 births
Living people
Russian male water polo players
Soviet male water polo players
Water polo goalkeepers
Olympic water polo players of the Soviet Union
Water polo players at the 1964 Summer Olympics
Olympic bronze medalists for the Soviet Union
Olympic medalists in water polo
Medalists at the 1964 Summer Olympics